Fenamic acid is an organic compound, which, especially in its ester form, is called fenamate. serves as a parent structure for several nonsteroidal anti-inflammatory drugs (NSAIDs), including mefenamic acid, tolfenamic acid, flufenamic acid, and meclofenamic acid.  These drugs are commonly referred to as "anthranilic acid derivatives" or "fenamates" because fenamic acid is a derivative of anthranilic acid.  

Fenamic acid can be synthesized from 2-chlorobenzoic acid and can be converted into acridone.

References

Anthranilic acids
Nonsteroidal anti-inflammatory drugs